Sala Municipality is a former municipality in Selonia, Latvia. The municipality was formed in 2009 by merging Sala parish and Sēlpils parish with the administrative centre being Sala. The population in 2020 was 3,233.

On 1 July 2021, Sala Municipality ceased to exist and its territory was merged into Jēkabpils Municipality.

See also 
 Administrative divisions of Latvia (2009)

References 

 
Former municipalities of Latvia